Dominique Taboga (born 6 November 1982) is an Austrian former professional footballer who played as a defender, before his arrest in a match-fixing scandal.

Club career

Early years
Taboga was born in Vienna, Austria. He started his career at St. Pölten's youth team in 1991. After only one year, he moved to ASV Spratzern. In January 1997 he went on loan to Admira Wacker before returning in June 1997. He went on to play for SK Rapid Wien and Kremser SC.

Professional career
In 2002, he moved to DSV Leoben. He made his senior debut on 25 July 2003 in an Austrian Football First League 1–0 win. He scored his first senior goal against Wacker Innsbruck on 13 September 2003.

After over four years in Leoben, he moved to Kapfenberger SV. In he 2007–08 season, won the Austrian Football First League. He made his debut in the Austrian Football Bundesliga 1–0 win against LASK Linz on 9 July 2008.

In 2009, he moved to Norwegian side Tromsø IL on a three-year contract.

Match fixing
In November 2013, Taboga claimed he was blackmailed by former Kapfenberger teammate Sanel Kuljić to fix matches forcing Kuljić to be taken into police custody. A few days later, Taboga admitted that he tried to convince four other players to manipulate a match during the 2012–13 season. He was eventually banned for life from playing, refereeing, and working as club official or player agent.

Honours
 Austrian second tier: 2007–08

References

Living people
1982 births
Association football defenders
Austrian footballers
Austrian expatriate footballers
Tromsø IL players
Expatriate footballers in Norway
Austrian Football Bundesliga players
Eliteserien players
Kapfenberger SV players
SV Grödig players
Match fixers
Sportspeople banned for life